Zabardast (meaning "Fantastic" in Hindi) is a 1985 Indian Hindi action film directed by Nasir Hussain, with his nephew Aamir Khan as assistant director, and produced by Mushir-Riaz. The film stars Sanjeev Kumar, Sunny Deol, Jaya Prada, Rajiv Kapoor, Rati Agnihotri and Amrish Puri. This was Hussain's final film.

Cast

 Sanjeev Kumar ... Ratan Kumar / Ramesh Kumar
 Sunny Deol ... Sunder Kumar / Shyam
 Jaya Prada ... Mala Sehgal
 Rajiv Kapoor ... Ravi Kumar / Tony
 Rati Agnihotri ... Sunita
 Tanuja ... Maharani Maanwati
Gita Siddharth ... Puspha Kumar
Kulbhushan Kharbanda ... Dr. Sehgal
Amrish Puri ... Balram Singh
Tariq ... Anwar
Rajendra Nath ... Monty
Arjun ... Vikram Singh
Ravindra Kapoor ... Dilawar Khan
Vikas Anand ... Police Inspector Verma
Mac Mohan ... Bheema

Plot
Ratan Kumar lives a middle-class existence with his wife, Pushpa and son, Sunder. When he is asked to commit a crime for Balram Singh, he does so, but decides to keep a suitcase full of diamonds for himself. An enraged Balram sets fire to his house. Believing his wife to be dead, Ratan flees, is rescued by Dr. Saigal, taken to the palace of a distraught Maharani Maanwati, who has just lost her son and husband, but is placated after being told that Sunder is her son. For years, Ratan, who now calls himself Ramesh, works for the Maharani, and when Sunder grows up, the Maharani learns of Ramesh's existence, finds that he closely resembles her husband, and marries him. Shortly thereafter, Pushpa re-surfaces, an enraged Maharani attempts to kill Ramesh, but ends up killing herself, before dying she asks Sunder to avenge her death. Sunder now hates Ramesh, not knowing that Ramesh is his real father. Fleeing from Sunder and the Police's wrath, Ramesh is apprehended by the Police, tried in Court, and sentenced to several years in jail. When he returns, he becomes an underworld don, with a sole motive of bringing an end to Balram. Meanwhile, Sunder, who now calls himself Shyam, is also on the lookout for Ramesh for taking his revenge, and has befriended Ravi, Ramesh's second son, who was born during his tenure in prison. When Balram finds this out, he plots to use Shyam to bring an end to Ramesh and his entire family - once and for all. Later, Shyam learns that Ramesh is his real father and innocent. It is now up to Shyam (Sunder) to save his father and family from Balram.

Soundtrack
Majrooh Sultanpuri write all songs.
"Jab Chaaha Yaara Tumne", sung by Kishore Kumar, is an evergreen classic.

References

External links
 

1985 films
1980s Hindi-language films
Films directed by Nasir Hussain
Films scored by R. D. Burman